Vinamilk, formally the Vietnam Dairy Products Joint Stock Company is the largest dairy company in Vietnam. Based on the UNDP 2007 Top 200 largest firms in Vietnam report, it was also the 15th largest company in Vietnam and formerly the most valuable public company listed in Vietnam. In 2010, it is the first company in Vietnam to be included in the Forbes Asia's 200 Best Under A Billion list that highlights 200 top-performing small- and mid-sized companies with annual revenue under US$1 billion.

The company was established in 1976 as the state-owned Southern Coffee-Dairy Company, to nationalize and take over the operations of three previously private dairy factories in South Vietnam:  Thống Nhất (belonging to a Chinese company),  Trường Thọ (formerly owned by Friesland Foods, best known for its production of condensed milk that was widely distributed across the South) and Dielac (Nestlé). It was renamed United Enterprises of Milk Coffee Cookies and Candies in 1978. It became the Vietnam Dairy Company, formally established in 1993. In 2003, following its IPO to the Ho Chi Minh Stock Exchange, the company legally changed its name to Vietnam Dairy Products Joint Stock Company (rading name "Vinamilk"). The principal activities of the Vinamilk are to produce and distribute condensed milk, powdered milk, fresh milk, soya milk, yogurts, ice-cream, cheese, fruit juice, coffee and other products derived from milk.

Vinamilk products such as powdered milk and condensed milk are also exported to the Middle East, Cambodia, the Philippines and Australia. Exports accounted for $180m in 2012. 
Vinamilk's main competitors are Dutch Lady Vietnam (a division of Friesland Foods), Nestlé Vietnam, Abbott, Mead Johnson (a subsidiary of Reckitt), Friso and Nutifood. In September 2016, Vinamilk signed a strategic cooperation agreement with Chr. Hansen to develop probiotics.

Ownership 
Vietnam's State Capital Investment Corporation (SCIC) holds 36% of the shares as of late 2017. 7.58% are owned by other Vietnamese investors, of which 0.28% are owned by CEO Mai Kieu Lien. Foreign investors hold over 53% of the shares.
 F&N Dairy Investments Pte Ltd: 16.50%
 Jardine Cycle & Carriage, via Platinum Victory Pte. Ltd. (PVPL): 10.03%
 F&N BEV Manufacturing PTE.Ltd: 2.70%
 Matthews Pacific Tiger Fund 2.02%
 Arisaig Asia Consumer Fund, Ltd 2.05%
 Deutsche Bank AG, London Branch: 1.09%
 other foreign investors: 30%
F&N have been holding shares of Vinamilk for a long time and have two representatives in the Board of Directors.

Factories & Subsidiaries
Vinamilk has factories in the following locations.

 Truong Tho Dairy Factory, Trường Thọ, Thủ Đức District, Ho Chi Minh City
 Dielac Dairy Factory, Bình An, Bien Hoa City, Đồng Nai
 Thong Nhat Dairy Factory, Trường Thọ, Thủ Đức District, Ho Chi Minh City
 Binh Dinh Dairy Factory, Qui Nhơn City, Bình Định Province
 Da Nang Dairy Factory, Hoa Khanh, Danang City
 Nghe An Dairy Factory, Nghi Thu, Cửa Lò, Nghệ An
 Sai Gon Dairy Factory, Hiệp Thành, District 12, Ho Chi Minh City
 Can Tho Dairy Factory, Trà Nóc, Bình Thủy District, Cần Thơ
 Tien Son Factory, Tiên Du, Bắc Ninh

Subsidiaries
Vinamilk has subsidiaries in the following locations.
Domestic
 Vietnam Dairy Factory, Binh Duong province
 Vietnam Powdered Milk Factory, Binh Duong province
 Lam Son Dairy Factory, Thanh Hoa City, Thanh Hoa Province
 Thong Nhat Thanh Hoa Dairy Cow Co., Ltd., Yen Dinh District, Thanh Hoa Province
 Vietnam Dairy Cow One-Member Co., Ltd., District 7, Ho Chi Minh City
Foreign
 Angkor Dairy Products Co., LTD, Phnom Penh, Cambodia. Producer of major Cambodian dairy brand Angkormilk.
 Vinamilk Europe Sp.z O.O in Warsaw Poland. European operations, primarily to secure raw milk ingredients for domestic production.
 Driftwood Dairy Holding Corporation, El Monte, California, USA. Major Californian processor of milk and dairy products.

Major brands
 Vinamilk
 Dielac
 Vfresh (juice and soya milk)
 Angkormilk
 Ong Tho (condensed milk)

Awards and Achievements
Forbes Global 2000: #1888
Forbes Asia's Fab 50:

External links
 Vinamilk

References

Companies listed on the Ho Chi Minh City Stock Exchange
Manufacturing companies based in Ho Chi Minh City
Government-owned companies of Vietnam
Dairy products companies of Vietnam
Food and drink companies established in 1976
Vietnamese brands
Vietnamese companies established in 1976
Food and drink companies of Vietnam